Fabian Schmutzler (born 19 October 2005) is a German professional darts player who currently plays in Professional Darts Corporation (PDC) events. He was the second-youngest player ever to compete in the PDC World Darts Championship and is one of the most promising talents in Germany.

Career
At the December 2018, Schmutzler got an electronic dartboard from his mother as a holiday gift. In February 2019, he really started playing darts and won his first national youth's tournament very quickly. Schmutzler plays in the DDV Bundesliga for the ESV Blaugold Flörsheim and is also part of the national team. After reaching the required age, Schmutzler gained his first experiences at the Professional Darts Corporation in November 2021 at the PDC Development Tour tournaments in Niedernhausen.

Right at his very first event, he played his way into the finals and could only be stopped there by the Rusty-Jake Rodriguez, who defeated him by 3–5 in legs. On November, he won his first international tournament against Marcel Gerdon by 5–2 in legs. The next day, he repeated his success by defeating Adam Gawlas by 5–2 in legs. Since Rusty-Jake Rodriguez already qualified for the 2022 PDC World Darts Championship via 2022 PDC Pro Tour, as a second ranked player in the European Development Tour Order of Merit, at just 16 years old he qualified for his first World Darts Championship.

At the 2021 PDC World Youth Championship at the end of November, Schmutzler did not survive the group stage, where he lost his decisive game against Keelan Kay. In December, Schmutzler made his PDC World Darts Championship debut against Ryan Meikle, but failed to win a set and lost. After attending PDC Q-School for the first time, Schmutzler made his European Tour debut at the 2022 International Darts Open, where he lost to Daryl Gurney by 2–6 in legs. Schmutzler was also at the 2022 UK Open for the first time. There he started this tournament with a 6–5 win against Kai Fan Leung and thus celebrated his first victory on television stage. He also edged Steve Clayson by 6–2 in legs. In the third round he lost to Adrian Lewis by 0–6 in legs.

World Championship results

PDC
 2022: First round (lost to Ryan Meikle 0–3) (sets)

Performance timeline

References

2005 births
Living people
German darts players
Sportspeople from Frankfurt